Goodenia berardiana is a species of flowering plant in the family Goodeniaceae and is endemic to Australia. It is an erect, widely distributed and variable annual herb with linear to egg-shaped, sometimes lobed or toothed leaves, and yellow flowers arranged in leafy racemes or few-flowered umbels.

Description

Taxonomy and naming
This species was first formally described in 1829 by Charles Gaudichaud-Beaupré as Distylis berardiana in his book Voyage autour du monde fait par ordre du Roi sur les corvettes de S. M. l'Uranie et la Physicienne, pendant les années 1817, 1818, 1819 et 1820. In 1979, Roger Charles Carolin changed the name to Goodenia berardiana in the journal Brunonia. The specific epithet (berardiana) honours Auguste Bérard, midshipman on Freycinet's voyage.

Distribution and habitat
Goodenia berardiana grows in a variety of habitats, often in sandy, stony or gravelly soils, or on mulga-dominated plains. It occurs in drier parts of southern and western Western Australia, South Australia, southern Northern Territory and the far west of New South Wales.

References

berardiana
Flora of South Australia
Eudicots of Western Australia
Flora of the Northern Territory
Flora of Queensland
Flora of New South Wales
Plants described in 1829
Taxa named by Charles Gaudichaud-Beaupré